Let's Make Up And Be Friendly was the fifth and, until 2007, final original album by the Bonzo Dog Band.  The group had already disbanded when United Artists Records (which absorbed the Bonzos' label Liberty Records) informed band members that the group owed the label one more album.  This 1972 farewell album was the result.  In 2007 the album was re-issued on CD by EMI with six bonus tracks, some of which were solo recordings by the members of the group.

"Rawlinson End", the longest track (at 9:07) on any Bonzos album, features the first official appearance of Vivian Stanshall's character Sir Henry Rawlinson, whose exploits would later be expanded as a series of BBC Radio 1 sessions for the John Peel show as Rawlinson End; a Sir Henry at Rawlinson End LP in 1978; and in 1984 a semi-sequel, Sir Henry at N'didi’s Kraal; a film, Sir Henry at Rawlinson End (1980), and accompanying book; and a final cameo appearance in a 1994 commercial for Ruddles Real Ale with Dawn French.

"The Strain", Stanshall's ode to lavatorial distress, was inspired by "Constipation Blues" by Screamin' Jay Hawkins, suitably filtered through Stanshall's own unique vision. Stanshall was a committed admirer of Hawkins, and had previously paid homage in similar fashion with "11 Moustachioed Daughters" (inspired by Hawkins' original 1963 recording of "Feast Of The Mau Mau") on The Bonzos' 1968 LP The Doughnut In Granny's Greenhouse.

Another of the album's claims to fame is that it was the first album to be recorded at The Manor Studio in November 1971, while the building itself was still in the process of being converted to accommodate the recording studio that was being built.

This was The Bonzo Dog Band's last album of new material featuring all the original members until their reunion in 2006, by which time founder member Vivian Stanshall was deceased.  A new studio album, Pour l'Amour des Chiens (French for For the Love of Dogs), was released in December 2007. The album is today controlled by the Parlophone unit of Warner Music Group.

The finished album was originally issued in vinyl and in 8-track format.

There are a few differences between British and American versions:
"Rusty"
UK: fades out at end
US: does not fade out and continues on past where UK's ends
Track gaps
The UK album has a longer time gap between "Waiting for the Wardrobe" and "Straight from My Heart", and between "Bad Blood" and "Slush", than does the US one.

Sleeve notes

Together with the 1974 The History of the Bonzos, the cover artwork for Friendly features an image of the eponymous "Bonzo Dog".

Track listing (LP)

Track listing (CD)

References

1972 albums
Bonzo Dog Doo-Dah Band albums
United Artists Records albums
Albums produced by Neil Innes
Albums produced by Vivian Stanshall